A History of Money and Banking in the United States is a 2002 book by economist Murray Rothbard, released posthumously based on his archived manuscripts. The author traces inflations, banking panics, and money meltdowns from the Colonial Period through the mid-20th century.

References

External links 
 A History of Money and Banking in the United States (510 pages) in pdf format
 Full text of the Introduction by Joseph Salerno (HTML format)
 David Gordon's 2002 Review
 Review of 2002 Edition by Joseph Stromberg.

Books about economic history
2002 non-fiction books
History of banking in the United States
History books about the United States
Books by Murray Rothbard